Mashonaland is a region in northern Zimbabwe.It is home to nearly half of the population of Zimbabwe. The majority of the Mashonaland people are from the Shona tribe while the Zezuru and Korekore dialects are most common. Harare is the largest city followed by Chitungwiza.

Currently, Mashonaland is divided into four provinces,
 Mashonaland West
 Mashonaland Central 
 Mashonaland East
 Harare 
The Zimbabwean capital of Harare, a province unto itself, lies entirely in Mashonaland.

Provincial history

It was originally one of the regions that the country was divided into following occupation by the Pioneer Column in 1890 and designated the extent of territory under administration of the British South Africa Company as distinct from the remainder of the territory that was directly under the control of the Matabele king, Lobengula, which was named Matabeleland when it was occupied in 1893. The two had separate administrations for part of the BSA Company colonial period.

Revolt broke out against the British South Africa Company in 1896, led by priests of the Mwari religion.  The British prevailed, executed some leaders, and tried to reform the system.

In 1923, the territory became part of the self-governing colony of Southern Rhodesia and Mashonaland became one of the five provinces. In 1970, an administrative reform led to Mashonaland being divided into a northern and a southern half. Most recently, in 1983, it was divided into the current three sectors and the capital city of Harare was given its own provincial status as well. Since the constitutional amendments that took effect in 1988, each is run by a governor appointed by the president.

Geographical features
The territory is composed of a broad plateau that slopes gradually to the north and north-west. The lowest land is on its northern border, which is formed by the Zambezi River, with Zambia beyond. A small part straddles the plateau at its south-eastern edge and here the land drains into the Save River but the rest of Mashonaland is part of the Zambezi drainage basin. To the south, the Munyati River forms the border with the current and former province of Midlands. The Nyangadzi river forms the border with Manicaland to the east.

Much of the landform is rolling low hills divided by river valleys. Only a few isolated mountains and the spine of the Umvukwes Range in the west rise higher.

Economy
The region's economy consists of the mining, agriculture and the service industry. Its facilities for tourism, fertile lands and mineral filled regions such as Bindura could improve the economy, but due to poor leadership and policies, the economy is lagging behind. Many Mashonaland citizens are farmers, and gain their source of income from agriculture.

References

External links
 James Anta: African Missionary to Mashonaland
 Provinces of Zimbabwe

Regions of Africa
British South Africa Company
Former British colonies and protectorates in Africa
Geography of Zimbabwe
Subdivisions of Zimbabwe